Sydeston (foaled 1985) was one of the best racehorses to come out of Tasmania in the history of Australian racing, and easily the best to do so in the modern era.  After winning a number of races in his home state, the plain brown gelding was transferred to Bob Hoysted in the middle of 1989.

Over the next 18 months, his wins included the Caulfield, Moonee Valley, and Sandown Cups, under handicap conditions, and the BMW International, the Queen Elizabeth Stakes, and the Caulfield Stakes at weight-for-age.  Sydeston was adept in all conditions, and regularly raced with Vo Rogue, Super Impose, Better Loosen Up, The Phantom, Kingston Rule and Shaftesbury Avenue.

References
 Sydeston's pedigree and racing stats

See also

List of millionaire racehorses in Australia

1985 racehorse births
Racehorses bred in Australia
Racehorses trained in Australia
Thoroughbred family 10
Caulfield Cup winners